Louis Angelo Marcon (born May 28, 1935) is a Canadian retired professional ice hockey player who played 60 games in the National Hockey League for the Detroit Red Wings between 1959 and 1963. The rest of his career, which lasted from 1955 to 1973, was spent in various minor leagues.

Career statistics

Regular season and playoffs

External links
 

1935 births
Living people
Canadian ice hockey defencemen
Cincinnati Mohawks (IHL) players
Detroit Red Wings players
Edmonton Flyers (WHL) players
Fort Worth Wings players
Ice hockey people from Ontario
Memphis Wings players
Montreal Royals (QSHL) players
Pittsburgh Hornets players
Rochester Americans players
Sportspeople from Thunder Bay